Sweet lemon and Sweet lime refer to groups of citrus hybrids that contain low acid pulp and juice. They are hybrids often similar to non-sweet lemons or limes, but with less citron parentage. Sweet limes and lemons are not sharply separated:

The same plant may also be known by different names:

The sweet lemons and sweet limes are not derived from either lemons or the more common limes, nor do they represent a monophyletic grouping, having arisen from distinct citrus hybridizations. Plants and fruits with the common name sweet lemon or sweet lime include:

 Citrus limetta, small and round like a common lime, with sweet juice, a citron/sour orange hybrid.
 Lumia, a large dry citron-like fruit that is pear shaped and not necessarily sweet. This is itself a mixed group: one member has been found to have resulted from a lemon crossing with a citron/pomelo hybrid, a second member is a micrantha/citron mix.
 Palestinian sweet lime, Citrus × latifolia, mainly used as a rootstock, a citron/mandarin/pomelo hybrid.
 Ujukitsu, Citrus ujukitsu, or 'lemonade fruit', likely a tangelo, a Kishu mikan crossed with a pomelo-like fruit, produced by citrus pioneer Chōzaburō Tanaka.

See also
 Citrus taxonomy

References